Colton Scott Underwood (born January 26, 1992) is an American reality television personality and former professional football player. He played defensive end at Illinois State and was signed by the San Diego Chargers as an undrafted free agent in 2014, and was on the practice squads of the Oakland Raiders and Philadelphia Eagles. After being released by the Raiders, Underwood became a contestant on the 14th season of The Bachelorette, and was then announced as the lead of the 23rd season of The Bachelor. He is the first lead in Bachelor franchise history to come out as gay.

Early life and education
Underwood was born in Indianapolis, Indiana, to Scott and Donna Underwood.  Both of his parents were star athletes at Illinois State University: Scott played college football for the Illinois State Redbirds and Donna played volleyball.  Scott and Colton both attended Washington Community High School; Colton graduated in 2010.  Colton has a younger brother named Connor. He was raised as Catholic.

Colton Underwood graduated from Illinois State University, where he followed his father's footsteps to play college football for the Redbirds.

Career

Football
On May 10, 2014, Underwood was signed as an undrafted free agent by the San Diego Chargers. On August 30, 2014, he was waived. On September 3, 2014, Underwood was signed to the Philadelphia Eagles' practice squad. On September 9, 2014, he was released from practice squad.

On September 23, 2014, Underwood returned to the Chargers and was signed to their practice squad. On December 29, 2014, he signed a future contract. On September 5, 2015, he was waived. On September 6, 2015, he was placed on injured reserve. On September 10, 2015, he was waived from injured reserve.

On December 1, 2015, Underwood was signed to the Oakland Raiders' practice squad. On August 29, 2016, he was released by the Raiders.

Reality television
Underwood was a contestant on the 14th season of The Bachelorette, starring Becca Kufrin.

After getting eliminated in week 8 after hometown dates, Underwood was cast in season 5 of Bachelor in Paradise.  After being linked to fellow contestant Tia Booth, Underwood broke up with her, and both left Paradise separately in the fourth week.

On September 4, 2018, ABC announced that Underwood would star in the 23rd season of The Bachelor. The announcement received mixed reactions on social media. On September 21, 2018, ABC announced that Colton had started filming The Bachelor and had already met three of his contestants on The Ellen DeGeneres Show.

On April 14, 2021, Variety reported that Underwood was in production for his own unscripted series at Netflix. The six-episode series, Coming Out Colton, premiered on Netflix on December 3, 2021. In the series, he meets with other openly gay public figures, including Gus Kenworthy, Michael Sam, and CMT host Cody Alan.

Philanthropy
In January 2016, Underwood founded the Colton Underwood Legacy Foundation to raise money for cystic fibrosis research and medical equipment.  Underwood started the foundation after his cousin Harper was diagnosed with the disease.  In January 2018, the foundation began the Legacy Project, with the goal of delivering AffloVests, chest wall oscillation devices which clear excess mucus from lung airways as part of the daily treatment for cystic fibrosis, to children in 50 US states.

Personal life
From 2016 to 2017, Underwood dated gymnast Aly Raisman after he asked her out in a video.

Underwood has spoken publicly about his choice to remain a virgin, and how appearing on The Bachelorette helped him discuss the topic. He began dating speech pathology student Cassie Randolph after meeting her on season 23 of The Bachelor. When Randolph initially ended their relationship during the final three, Underwood broke up with the other two women and asked Randolph for a second chance without the pressure of an engagement. Underwood and Randolph were in a relationship from November 2018 until May 2020.

In March 2020, Underwood tested positive for COVID-19, though he recovered in April.

In September 2020, Randolph filed a restraining order against Underwood, alleging that he stalked her outside her Los Angeles apartment and her parents' Huntington Beach house, sent harassing text messages using an anonymous number, and installed a tracking device underneath her car. Randolph was granted a temporary restraining order against Underwood ahead of the October hearing. Randolph dropped the restraining order in November, and Underwood stated "I do not believe Cassie did anything wrong in filing for the restraining orders and also believe she acted in good faith." He identifies himself as a Christian.

Coming out
On April 14, 2021, Underwood publicly came out as gay in an interview with Robin Roberts on Good Morning America, making him the first lead in the Bachelor franchise to come out as gay.

In an interview with Variety, Underwood stated that he was blackmailed into coming out. An anonymous man, claiming to be a fan, took a picture of Underwood nude at a gay sauna in Los Angeles in 2019. The man sent Underwood an email threatening to out him to the press. Underwood forwarded the email to his publicist, and this caused him to come out publicly. During the interview, Underwood also stated that he experimented with men before appearing on The Bachelor franchise, stating he used the dating app Grindr under an alias from 2016 to 2017.

On September 1, 2021, Underwood was reported to be dating Democratic strategist Jordan C. Brown after the two were spotted vacationing together in Hawaii, which he confirmed in December 2021 in a birthday post for Brown. In February 2022, Underwood confirmed that he and Brown had gotten engaged shortly after his 30th birthday the previous month.

Filmography

Television

Music video

Awards and nominations

Books
The First Time: Finding Myself and Looking for Love on Reality TV (Gallery Books, 2020). .

See also
Homosexuality in American football

References

External links

 Archive of Colton Underwood at San Diego Chargers official website.

1992 births
Living people
21st-century American LGBT people
American football linebackers
Bachelor Nation contestants
Gay sportsmen
Illinois State Redbirds football players
LGBT people from Indiana
LGBT players of American football
American LGBT sportspeople
LGBT Christians
American Roman Catholics
Oakland Raiders players
Philadelphia Eagles players
Players of American football from Indianapolis
San Diego Chargers players
Participants in American reality television series